Federico Vairo Moramarco (27 January 1930 – 7 December 2010) was an Argentine football defender who won three consecutive league titles with River Plate and represented Argentina at the 1958 World Cup.

His younger brother Juan Apolonio Vairo Moramarco also played football professionally, including one season for Juventus.

Early life
Federico Vairo was born in Rosario, Argentina.

Club career
Vairo started his career at Rosario Central in his home city in 1947, he played for the club for 8 seasons before moving to Buenos Aires to play for River Plate. River won three consecutive league titles between 1955 and 1957.

Vairo played for the Argentina National team at the World Cup held in Sweden in 1958. At one time he was the player with the most games played for the national team. His record was not broken until the 1990s.

In 1960 Vairo joined Chilean O'Higgins. His first three seasons with the club resulted in mid-table finishes, but the 1963 campaign saw the club relegated, finishing 18th and last in the table.

1964 saw O'Higgins' successful return to the Primera División de Chile by winning the Chilean Second Division title. In 1965 Vairo dedicated his life to the youth leagues as coach of River Plate, where he was in charge of training and turning amateurs to professionals first division footballers.

From 1999–2010, River Plate hired him to scout youth players from the Santa Fe Province. One of the best players he scouted was Lionel Messi, when he was 12 years old, despite the fact that he later left the club for Barcelona. 

In 2005, he was given an award at the 50th anniversary party of O'Higgins.

International career

Between 1955 and 1958 Vairo played 41 games for the Argentina national football team. He helped Argentina to win the 1957 Copa America and represented Argentina at the 1958 World Cup.

Death
On 7 December 2010, Federico Vairo died in a hospital in Buenos Aires, Argentina, from stomach cancer. He is survived by his brother Juan Vairo, his wife Marta, and his three children, Graciela, Daniel, and Claudia.

References

External links

1930 births
2010 deaths
Footballers from Rosario, Santa Fe
Argentine footballers
Argentine expatriate footballers
Association football defenders
Rosario Central footballers
Club Atlético River Plate footballers
O'Higgins F.C. footballers
Expatriate footballers in Chile
Argentine expatriate sportspeople in Chile
Deportivo Cali footballers
Argentine Primera División players
Primera B de Chile players
Categoría Primera A players
Expatriate footballers in Colombia
Argentine expatriate sportspeople in Colombia
Argentina international footballers
1958 FIFA World Cup players
Deaths from stomach cancer
Deaths from cancer in Argentina
Argentine people of Italian descent